Newcastelia is a genus of flowering plants in the mint family, Lamiaceae, first described in 1857 by Ferdinand von Mueller, who placed it in the family, Verbenaceae. The entire genus is endemic to Australia.

Species
 Newcastelia bracteosa F.Muell. - Western Australia, South Australia, Northern Territory
 Newcastelia cephalantha F.Muell. - Western Australia, South Australia, Northern Territory, Queensland
 Newcastelia cladotricha F.Muell. - Western Australia, Northern Territory
 Newcastelia elliptica Munir - Western Australia, Northern Territory
 Newcastelia hexarrhena F.Muell. - Western Australia
 Newcastelia insignis E.Pritz. - Western Australia
 Newcastelia interrupta Munir - Queensland
 Newcastelia roseoazurea Rye - Western Australia
 Newcastelia spodiotricha F.Muell. - Western Australia, South Australia, Northern Territory
 Newcastelia velutina Munir - Queensland

Gallery

See also
 Rye, B. L. (1996) A taxonomic review of the genera Lachnostachys, Newcastelia and Physopsis (Chloanthaceae) in Western Australia 
 Wheeler, J. R.; Rye, B. L.; Koch, B. L.; Wilson, A. J. G.; Western Australian Herbarium (1992). Flora of the Kimberley region. Western Australian Herbarium. Como, W.A.
 Blackall, William E.; Grieve, Brian J. (1981). How to know Western Australian wildflowers : a key to the flora of the extratropical regions of Western Australia. Part IIIB, (Epacridaceae-Lamiaceae). University of W.A. Press. Perth.

References

 
Lamiaceae genera
Endemic flora of Australia
Taxa named by Ferdinand von Mueller
Plants described in 1957